The 1952 South Carolina Gamecocks football team was an American football team that represented the University of South Carolina as a member of the Southern Conference (SoCon) during the 1952 college football season. In their 12th season under head coach Rex Enright, the Gamecocks compiled an overall record of 5–5 with a mark of 2–4– in conference play, tying for tenth place in the SoCon.

Schedule

References

South Carolina
South Carolina Gamecocks football seasons
South Carolina Gamecocks football